Camargue red rice is a variety of red rice cultivated in the wetlands of the Camargue region of southern France.

History
Red wild rice had traditionally grown in the marshes of the Camargue. 

Shortly after World War II vast swaths of salt marshes were desalinated. To boost the local economy, the previous production of salt was replaced by agriculture. Production of white rice was at its peak in the 1960s. 

By the 1980s this white rice had cross-pollinated with red wild rice, giving birth to the current breed of Camargue red rice.

Description
Once the husk is removed, the bran is a brownish-red colour. It has an intense somewhat nutty taste and a naturally chewy texture.

References

Rice varieties
Camargue